Øyvind Skaanes (born 29 May 1968) is a former Norwegian cross-country skier who competed from 1990 to 1999. He won the gold medal in the 4 × 10 km relay at the 1991 FIS Nordic World Ski Championships in Val di Fiemme and earned his best individual of 15th in the 30 km event at those same championships.

Skaanes won two individual races in his career with a 30 km event in 1996 and a 10 km event in 1998.

Cross-country skiing results
All results are sourced from the International Ski Federation (FIS).

World Championships
 1 medal – (1 gold)

World Cup

Season standings

Team podiums

 3 victories
 6 podiums

References

External links

Norwegian male cross-country skiers
1968 births
Living people
FIS Nordic World Ski Championships medalists in cross-country skiing
Sportspeople from Trondheim